Elmer Berry (October 9, 1879 – April 21, 1952) was an American college football and basketball player and coach. He first served as a men's basketball coach at the University of Nebraska in Lincoln, Nebraska during the 1900–01 season.

Berry later served as the head football coach (1917 to 1921) and men's basketball coach (1915 to 1922) at the Springfield YMCA School, now known as Springfield College.

Berry was born on October 9, 1879, in Davey, Nebraska. He died on April 21, 1952, at his home in Vida, Oregon.

References

1879 births
1942 deaths
Nebraska Cornhuskers men's basketball coaches
Springfield Pride football coaches
Springfield Pride football players
Springfield Pride men's basketball coaches
Sportspeople from Lincoln, Nebraska
Coaches of American football from Nebraska
Players of American football from Nebraska
Basketball coaches from Nebraska